Isirawa is a Papuan language spoken by about two thousand people on the north coast of Papua province, Indonesia. It's a local trade language, and use is vigorous. Stephen Wurm (1975) linked it to the Kwerba languages within the Trans–New Guinea family, and it does share about 20% of its vocabulary with neighboring Kwerba languages. However, based on its pronouns, Malcolm Ross (2005) felt he could not substantiate such a link, and left it as a language isolate. The pronouns are not, however, dissimilar from those of Orya–Tor, which Ross links to Kwerba, and Donahue (2002) accept it as a Greater Kwerba language.

Locations
In Sarmi Regency, Isirawa is spoken in Amsira, Arabais, Arsania, Kamenawari, Mararena, Martewar, Nisero, Nuerawar, Perkami, Siaratesa, Waim, Wari, and Webro villages.

Grammar
In Isirawa, the feminine gender is associated with big objects, and masculine with small objects; the opposite association is found in Tayap and the Sepik languages, which classify large objects as masculine rather than feminine.

Pronouns
The Isirawa pronouns are,

{| class=wikitable
|-
| I || a-, e 
|-
| we || nen-, ne
|-
| you || o-, mə
|-
| all third person || e-, maə, ce, pe
|}

Ross's reconstructed Orya–Tor pronouns are *ai 'I', *ne 'we' (inclusive), *emei 'thou', *em 'you'.

Isirawa pronoun paradigm as given in Foley (2018):
{| class="wikitable"
! pronoun !! nominative !! accusative !! possessive
|-
| 1s || e || afo || wə
|-
| 2s || mɪ || ofo || of
|-
| 3s ||  || efo || ef
|-
| 1d || ne || nenfo || nenef
|-
| 2d || mɪ || ofnafo || ofnaf
|-
| 3d ||  || efnafo || efnaf
|-
| 1p || ne || nenfɪvo || nenfɪ(v)
|-
| 2p || mɪ || ofɪvo || ofɪ(v)
|-
| 3p ||  || efɪvo || efɪ(v)
|}

References

Clouse, Duane, Mark Donohue and Felix Ma. 2002. "Survey report of the north coast of Irian Jaya."

Languages of western New Guinea
Unclassified languages of New Guinea
Kwerbic languages